Dungannon railway station served Dungannon in  County Tyrone in Northern Ireland.

The Portadown, Dungannon and Omagh Junction Railway opened the station on 5 April 1858. On 2 September 1861, the station was relocated as the line was extended to Omagh railway station completing the  – Derry railway route that came to be informally called "The Derry Road".

In 1876 it was taken over by the Great Northern Railway and built a branch line from Dungannon to Cookstown in 1879.

It closed on 15 February 1965.

Railway Revival
There is the future possibility of the line being reopened to Portadown railway station.

There are plans to reopen railway lines in Northern Ireland including the line from Portadown to Dungannon as well as towards Omagh.

There is the possibility of reopening the railway from Portadown to Armagh railway station.

Routes

References

Disused railway stations in County Tyrone
Railway stations opened in 1858
Railway stations closed in 1965
Railway stations in Northern Ireland opened in the 19th century